Keira Hewatch, (born 8 November 1985) is a Nigerian actress, singer, songwriter and writer, best known for her role as ‘Keche’ in the movie; Two Brides and a Baby, as well as her role as ‘Peace Nwosu’ in the television series; Lekki Wives 
Hewatch won the Best of Nollywood award (BON) for ‘Best Breakout Performance’ in 2011 and has been nominated twice for the Golden Icon Academy Awards (GIAMA).

Early life and background
Hewatch was born in Calabar, Cross River State. Her mother, Elizabeth Hewatch, is a teacher with the police force, who raised Keira as a single parent and her father a missionary.
Her mother was transferred to Minna, Niger State to teach in the Police secondary school and took 11 year old Keira with her. Hewatch's family relocated to Ghana in 2005, where she was enrolled in the Graduate school of management Studies to study Travel and Tourism and Hospitality Management. In 2006, on completing her certification exams, Hewatch decided to pursue her passion for acting.

She spent another year in Ghana trying to break into the entertainment industry to no avail, as most of the roles involved speaking the local dialect. In 2007, she returned to Nigeria, to continue pursuing her passion for acting.

Career
Bearing a semblance to fellow Nollywood actress, Mercy Johnson; the acting skills of both are described as being similar. she claimed that sometimes she gets insulted due to her semblance to Mercy Johnson. Hewatch's first break came in the television series Cross Roads produced by Emeka Ossai. In 2010 she starred as the lead, starring alongside Desmond Elliot, in the first but adjudged failed science fiction/futuristic film, Kajola, directed by Niyi Akinmolayan. The film was not well received in Nigerian cinemas.

In 2011, she went on to star as ‘Keche’  the lead role, in Two Brides and a Baby alongside OC Ukeje, Stella Damasus-Aboderin, Chelsea Eze and Okey Uzoeshi. Hewatch attributes her flair for acting to having come from being inspired by the children of The Sound of Music after watching it for the first time at the age of 5.

In 2012 she was nominated as the best new actress in 2012 for the Golden Icon Academy Awards (GIAMA).

She works with a charity organization; ‘The wings of love foundation’, which focused on helping widows, orphans and young people get off the streets and building a life for themselves.

Filmography

See also
 List of Nigerian actors

References

External links
 

21st-century Nigerian actresses
21st-century Nigerian women singers
Nigerian songwriters
1985 births
Living people
Nigerian television actresses
Actresses from Cross River State
Nigerian film actresses
Nigerian film award winners
Nigerian writers
Nigerian philanthropists
Nigerian humanitarians